Russell Lewis (born 8 July 1949) is a Welsh former footballer who made more than 300 appearances in the Football League playing as a defender for Northampton Town and Swindon Town.

References
General
 . Retrieved 10 June 2018.
Specific

1956 births
Living people
Welsh footballers
Association football defenders
Bridgend Town A.F.C. players
Swindon Town F.C. players
Northampton Town F.C. players
Kettering Town F.C. players
Merthyr Tydfil F.C. players
Rushden & Diamonds F.C. players
English Football League players